Victor Keppler (1904 – 2 December 1987) was an American commercial photographer and author.

Biography
Keppler was born in Manhattan. He graduated from Stuyvesant High School and City College of New York.

Throughout his career as a photographer, Keppler did advertisements for clients such as Camel Cigarettes and the United States government. Keppler also did cover photos for The Saturday Evening Post.

He founded the Famous Photographers School in Westport, Connecticut, which existed from 1961 until 1972. (The Famous Photographers School was connected to the Famous Artists School and the Famous Artists School.)

As a published author, Keppler wrote A Life of Color Photography: The Eighth Art (1938) and Victor Keppler: Man and Camera (1970).

Gallery

References

1904 births
1987 deaths
20th-century American photographers
People from Manhattan